Bendhechhi Beena is a Bengali studio album by renowned Bollywood playback singer Shreya Ghoshal. Released on 1 January 1998 by Sagarika Music, the album happens to be the first studio album of Ghoshal, consisting of 14 tracks. The songs are cover versions of classic Bengali hits by songstresses like Parveen Sultana, Asha Bhosle, Lata Mangeshkar, Sandhya Mukhopadhyay and many others. The tracks; which have been adapted from compositions by well-known music directors of Bengal including R. D. Burman, Salil Chowdhury and Sudhin Dasgupta; were rearranged by music director Amit Bandyopadhyay for this album.

Personnel 
Credits adapted from the album's back cover.

Technical and instruments
 Amit Bandyopadhyay – music arrangement
 J. M. D. Sounds – sound design
 Samir Das – recording engineer

On the track "Bendhechi Beena Gaan Shonabo"
 Sapan Chakraborty – writer
 R. D. Burman – composer
Notes – Originally sung by Parveen Sultana.

On the track "Surero Ei Jhar Jhar Jharna"
 Salil Chowdhury – writer
 Salil Chowdhury – composer
Notes – Originally sung by Sabita Chowdhury.

On the track "O Pakhi Ure Aay"
 Pulak Bandyopadhyay – writer
 Abhijit Bandyopadhyay – composer
Notes – Originally sung by Asha Bhosle.

On the track "Ene De Ene De Jhumka"
 Salil Chowdhury – writer
 Salil Chowdhury – composer
Notes – Originally sung by Sabita Chowdhury.

On the track "Jhum Jhum Jhum Raat Nijhum"
 Sapan Chakraborty – writer
 R. D. Burman – composer
Notes – Originally sung by Asha Bhosle.

On the track "Saat Ranga Ek Pakhi"
 Sunil Baran – writer
 Sudhin Dasgupta – composer
Notes – Originally sung by Pratima Banerjee.

On the track "Jiban Gaan Gahe Ke Je"
 Salil Chowdhury – writer
 Hridaynath Mangeshkar – composer
Notes – Originally sung by Asha Bhosle.

On the track "Dure Akash Shamianay"
 Gouri Prasanna Majumdar – writer
 Hridaynath Mangeshkar – composer
Notes – Originally sung by Lata Mangeshkar.

On the track "Oli Amon Kore Noy"
 Pulak Bandyopadhyay – writer
 Nachiketa Ghosh – composer
Notes – Originally sung by Madhuri Chatterjee.

On the track "Akashe Aaj Ranger Khela"
 Sudhin Dasgupta – writer
 Sudhin Dasgupta – composer
Notes – Originally sung by Asha Bhosle.

On the track "Kon Se Aalor Swapno Niye"
 Sudhin Dasgupta – writer
 Sudhin Dasgupta – composer
Notes – Originally sung by Asha Bhosle.

On the track "Ni Sa Ga Ma Pa Ni"
 Salil Chowdhury – writer
 Salil Chowdhury – composer
Notes – Originally sung by Sandhya Mukhopadhyay.

On the track "Akash Jure Swapno Maya"
 Anal Chattopadhyay – writer
 Kanu Ghosh – composer
Notes – Originally sung by Geeta Dutt.

On the track "O Tota Pakhi Re"
 Prabir Majumder – writer
 Prabir Majumder – composer
Notes – Originally sung by Nirmala Mishra.

Track listing

References 

Shreya Ghoshal albums